Danny Hill (born 31 October 1984), also known by the nicknames of "TerminHillster", "Sicknote"& "Benny Hill" is an English former professional rugby league footballer who played for the Widnes Vikings, Hull F.C. and the Wigan Warriors.

Hill started out his career at West Hull before joining up with Hull FC, and joining their scholarship scheme. He was highly rated by the Hull club and showed a lot of power and aggression that got him a call up to the England Schoolboys & Academy that toured Australia in the 2001 season. Hill made an appearance on Live & Kicking with Toby Anstis to show how his ADHD aided his game.

Hill was signed by Brian Noble of Wigan last season who claims Danny is a 'quality young player' with Hill being just 21 years of age with plenty of experience already. Hull fans where unhappy at Hill's departure as he was rated highly within the club but many fans saw him to be too injury prone for their liking and Wigan experienced this problem last season with Danny missing the most crucial part of the 2006 season with the Warriors as they battled against relegation.

Luckily for Hill, Wigan Warriors survived relegation from the Super League, and he could concentrate on making a big impact on the 2007 season for the Wigan Warriors.

Hill went to the Hull Kingston Rovers on 12 April 2007 on a month's Loan.

Danny Hill failed to break into the Wigan Warriors first team during 2007 and on 28 November 2007 it was announced that he would be released from his contract so that he could get more first team experience and so that Wigan Warriors could afford another player under the salary cap. On 29 November 2007 Widnes Vikings announced they had signed Danny Hill along with Jim Gannon from the Hull Kingston Rovers.

References

External links
Danny Hill's squad profile

1984 births
Living people
English rugby league players
Hull F.C. players
Hull Kingston Rovers players
Rugby league players from Kingston upon Hull
Rugby league props
Rugby league second-rows
Widnes Vikings players
Wigan Warriors players
York City Knights players